John Stephens Graham (August 4, 1905 – October 20, 1976) was a Washington, D.C. attorney and political appointee. He was an Assistant Secretary of the Treasury, and commissioners for the Internal Revenue Service and Atomic Energy Commission.

Early life and education
Graham was born August 4, 1905, in Reading, Massachusetts, son of Joseph L. Graham, a R.J. Reynolds Tobacco Company executive, and Margaret Nowell Graham, an artist.  His older sister was Katherine G. Howard, an Eisenhower administration official.  He was a cousin of Margaret Mitchell, the author of Gone With the Wind.

Graham graduated from the University of North Carolina at Chapel Hill and attended Harvard Law School before graduating from University of Virginia School of Law with close friend Frank Wisner.

Career
During World War II, Graham served in the United States Navy.

Graham served as Assistant Secretary of the Treasury during the second term of President Harry S. Truman and Secretary of the Treasury John Wesley Snyder. He served as the 30th Commissioner of Internal Revenue from November 19, 1952, until January 19, 1953.

After Dwight D. Eisenhower became president in 1953, Graham became a financial and business consultant in Washington, D.C. until 1956, when he served as national treasurer for Volunteers for Stevenson, the campaign to elect Adlai Stevenson President of the United States, against incumbent President Eisenhower.

On September 12, 1957, when Graham was 51, he was appointed as a commissioner of the U.S. Atomic Energy Commission by Eisenhower, and as a delegate to the International Atomic Energy Agency.  The President, along with partisan Lewis Strauss, both Republicans, appointed Graham, a Democrat, to fill out John von Neumann's term following Neumann's death. This was done as a show of conciliation between the President and the Joint Committee  Graham served as a commissioner on the commission until June 30, 1962.

Personal life
He married Elizabeth Foster Breckinridge (1911–2005), daughter of Henry S. Breckinridge and Ruth Bradley Woodman Breckinridge.  Elizabeth's father was the United States Assistant Secretary of War under Woodrow Wilson,  and was a member of the prominent Breckinridge family. She was born in Monterey, Pennsylvania, grew up in Washington, D.C. and Bethesda, Maryland, and was a 1933 graduate of Vassar College. She was a tutor, teacher and founder of an after-school program, Tuesday School.

Graham and his wife lived in Winston-Salem, N.C. before moving to Washington, D.C. in 1942 where Graham served in the Navy. The couple had four daughters:

 Katherine Graham
 Louise Graham
 Margaret "Polly" Graham, who married Joseph Coreth (1937-2014)
 Susan Graham

Graham died on October 20, 1976 in Washington, D.C. His wife, Elizabeth, lived until October 25, 2005, when she died following a heart attack.

Notes 

Subnotes

References

Further reading

External links
 U.S. Delegates to the Fourth General Conference of the International Atomic Energy Agency (photo)

1905 births
1976 deaths
People from Winston-Salem, North Carolina
University of North Carolina at Chapel Hill alumni
Harvard Law School alumni
Breckinridge family
International Atomic Energy Agency officials
University of Virginia School of Law alumni
20th-century American lawyers
Commissioners of Internal Revenue